is a Japanese web manga series written by Fuwai and illustrated by Kyū Sakazuki. It was serialized on Shogakukan's online platforms MangaONE and Ura Sunday from December 2015 to May 2022.

Publication
Written by Fuwai and illustrated by Kyū Sakazuki, Sōkyū Boys was serialized on Shogakukan's online platform MangaONE from December 29, 2015, to May 27, 2022; it was also published on Ura Sunday from January 6, 2016, to June 3, 2022. Shogakukan released twenty-five tankōbon volumes from May 18, 2016, to November 17, 2022.

Volume list

References

External links
  

Ball games in anime and manga
Handball culture
School life in anime and manga 
Shogakukan manga
Shōnen manga
Webcomics in print